= VietAbroader =

VietAbroader is a non-profit, student-run organization devoted to the sustainable development of Vietnam. It aims its message at Vietnamese youth. The group was founded in February 2004 by students from various Ivy League schools.
